Myitung Naw (born 28 December 1933) is a Burmese long-distance runner. He competed in the marathon at the 1956 Summer Olympics and the 1960 Summer Olympics.

References

External links
 

1933 births
Living people
Athletes (track and field) at the 1956 Summer Olympics
Athletes (track and field) at the 1960 Summer Olympics
Burmese male long-distance runners
Burmese male marathon runners
Olympic athletes of Myanmar
Asian Games medalists in athletics (track and field)
Asian Games silver medalists for Myanmar
Asian Games bronze medalists for Myanmar
Athletes (track and field) at the 1958 Asian Games
Athletes (track and field) at the 1962 Asian Games
Medalists at the 1958 Asian Games
Medalists at the 1962 Asian Games
Southeast Asian Games medalists in athletics
Southeast Asian Games gold medalists for Myanmar